Morton Rangers was an association football club based in Shepherd's Bush.

History

The club entered the FA Cup once, in 1881-82, losing to the Old Foresters in the first round.  The club's starting eleven was made up of seven players who had played for St Peter's Institute the previous season and four from the newly-defunct Clarence.

The club was a founder member of the London Football Association in 1882 but the last mention of the club is a club representative attending the London FA annual general meeting in October 1885, with the last reported match for Morton Rangers being a 1-0 defeat to Somerset in the first round of the London Senior Cup in 1884.

It is possible that Morton Rangers is the same club as the Wandsworth club Rangers F.C. which played in the London Senior Cup and in the Surrey Cup until 1889.

Colours

The club's colours were described as light blue and black.

References

Association football clubs established in 1880
1880 establishments in England
Shepherd's Bush
Defunct football clubs in England
Sport in Hammersmith and Fulham
Defunct football clubs in London